Veterinary parasitology is a branch of veterinary medicine that deals with the study of morphology, life-cycle, pathogenesis, diagnosis, treatment, and control of eukaryotic invertebrates of the kingdom Animalia and the taxon Protozoa that depend upon other invertebrates and higher vertebrates for their propagation, nutrition, and metabolism without necessarily causing the death of their hosts. Modern parasitology focuses on responses of animal hosts to parasitic invasion. Parasites of domestic animals, (livestock and pet animals), as well as wildlife animals are considered. Data obtained from parasitological research in animals helps in veterinary practice and improves animal breeding. The major goal of veterinary parasitology is to protect animals and improve their health, but because a number of animal parasites are transmitted to humans, veterinary parasitology is also important for public health.

Diagnostic methods  
Various methods are used to identify parasites in animals, using feces, blood, and tissue samples from the host animal.

Coprological
Coprological examinations involve examining the feces of animals to identify and count parasite eggs. Some common methods include fecal flotation and sedimentation to separate eggs from fecal matter. Others include the McMaster method, which uses a special two-chamber slide that allows parasite eggs to be more clearly visible and easily counted. It is most commonly used to monitor parasites in horses and other grazing and livestock animals. The Baermann method is similar but requires more specialized equipment and more time and is typically used to diagnose lungworm and threadworm.

Haematological
Haematological examinations involve examining the blood of animals to determine the presence of parasites. Blood parasites tend to inhabit the erythrocytes or white blood cells and are most likely to be detected during the acute phase of infection. Veterinary parasitologists use blood smears, which involve placing a drop of blood onto a slide and spreading it over the surface in a thin film in order to examine it under a microscope. The blood is stained with a dye in order for the cells to be easily distinguished.

Histopathological
Histopathological examinations involve examining tissue samples from animals. A small slice of the organ suspected of being infected by parasites is mounted on a slide, stained, and examined under a microscope.

Though not technically considered a histopathological technique, skin scraping – which involves taking a small sample of the epidermal cells of a dog, cat, or other household pet – is commonly used to detect the presence of mites.

Immunological
Immunological examinations, such as indirect immunofluorescence, ELISA, Immunoblotting (Western blot), and Complement fixation test are methods of identifying different kinds of parasites by detecting the presence of their antigens on or within the parasite itself. These diagnostic methods are used in conjunction with coprological examinations for more specific identification of different parasite species in fecal samples.

Molecular biological
Molecular biological methods involve studying the DNA of the parasite in order to identify it. PCR and RFLP are used to detect and amplify parasite DNA found in the feces, blood, or tissue of the host. These techniques are very sensitive, which is useful for diagnosing parasites even when they are present in very low numbers; they are also useful for identifying parasites not only in large animal hosts but smaller insect vectors.

Divisions of veterinary parasitology

Veterinary protozoology
Veterinary protozoology is focused on protozoas with veterinary relevance. Examples of protozoan parasites:
Babesia divergens
Balantidium coli
Besnoitia besnoiti
Cryptosporidium parvum
Eimeria acervulina
Eimeria tenella
Giardia lamblia (also known as Giardia duodenalis)
Hammondia hammondi
Histomonas meleagridis
Isospora canis
Leishmania donovani
Leishmania infantum
Neospora caninum
Toxoplasma gondii
Trichomonas gallinae
Tritrichomonas foetus
Trypanosoma brucei
Trypanosoma equiperdum

Veterinary helminthology
Veterinary helminthology is focused on veterinary important helminth parasites, for example:
Ancylostoma caninum
Ancylostoma ceylanicum
Ancylostoma duodenale
Ascaris suum
Dicrocoelium dendriticum
Dictyocaulus viviparus
Dipylidium caninum
Echinococcus granulosus
Fasciola hepatica
Fascioloides magna
Habronema species
Haemonchus contortus
Metastrongylus
Muellerius capillaris
Ostertagia ostertagi
Paragonimus westermani
Schistosoma bovis
Strongyloides species
Strongylus vulgaris
Syngamus trachea (Gapeworm)
Taenia pisiformis
Taenia saginata
Taenia solium
Toxascaris leonina
Toxocara canis
Toxocara cati
Trichinella spiralis
Trichobilharzia regenti
Trichostrongylus species
Trichuris suis
Trichuris vulpis

Veterinary entomology (arachnoentomology)
Veterinary entomology is focused on important arachnids, insects, and crustaceans. Some examples include:
Caligus species
Cimex colombarius
Cimex lectularius
Culex pipiens
Culicoides imicola
Demodex bovis
Dermacentor reticulatus
Gasterophilus intestinalis
Haematobia irritans
Hypoderma bovis
Ixodes ricinus
Knemidocoptes mutans (causing the disease scaly leg)
Lepeophtheirus salmonis (sea louse)
Lucilia sericata
Musca domestica
Nosema apis
Notoedres cati
Oestrus ovis
Otodectes cynotis
Phlebotomus species
Psoroptes ovis
Pulex irritans
Rhipicephalus sanguineus
Sarcoptes equi
Sarcophaga carnaria
Tabanus atratus
Triatoma species
Ctenocephalides canis
Ctenocephalides felis

References

External links 
 World Association for Advancement of Veterinary Parasitology
 Guide to Veterinary Diagnostic Parasitology
 American Association of Veterinary Parasitologists

 
Parasitology